WEMJ (1490 AM) is a radio station broadcasting a news/talk format. Licensed to Laconia, New Hampshire, United States, the station is owned by Binnie Media and licensed to WBIN Media Co., Inc. WEMJ features programming from ABC News Radio. WEMJ is known on-air as 107.3 WEMJ (after its translator frequency). It is part of the "Pulse of NH" trimulcast with 107.7 WTPL in the Manchester market and 98.1 WTSN in the Seacoast Region.

WEMJ, along with 16 other stations in northern New England formerly owned by Nassau Broadcasting Partners, was purchased at bankruptcy auction by WBIN Media Company, a company controlled by Bill Binnie, on May 22, 2012. Binnie already owned WBIN-TV in Derry and WYCN-CD in Nashua. The deal was completed on November 30, 2012. In March 2016, WEMJ began a simulcast on W297BS (107.3 FM, referred to as "WEMJ-FM" by the New Hampshire Association of Broadcasters) and updated their branding to reflect this new over-the-air listening option.

WEMJ dropped its news/talk programming on May 23, 2019, becoming a Lakes Region simulcast of Binnie's contemporary hit radio station in Concord, WJYY (105.5 FM). In October 2020, coinciding with the launch of a late morning talk show hosted by former WGIR morning host Jack Heath (which airs on WEMJ, WTPL, and WTSN), WEMJ returned to a news/talk format.

Translators
In addition to the main station, WEMJ is relayed by an FM translator.

Previous logos

References

External links

EMJ
News and talk radio stations in the United States
Laconia, New Hampshire
Belknap County, New Hampshire
Radio stations established in 1961
1961 establishments in New Hampshire